Melocanna is a genus of Asian clumping bamboo in the grass family.

The 48-year cycle of M. baccifera in northeastern India is responsible for the phenomenon called "mautam" or "bamboo death", in which large populations of bamboo flower at the same time, this being followed by a plague of rats, which in turn triggers a famine within the human populations.

Species
 Melocanna arundina C.E.Parkinson – Thailand, Myanmar; naturalized in parts of southern China
 Melocanna baccifera (Roxb.) Kurz - Nagaland, Nepal, Sikkim, Bhutan, Assam, Mizoram, Manipur, Bangladesh, Myanmar; sparingly naturalized in parts of West Indies and South America

Formerly included
see Bambusa, Cephalostachyum, Gigantochloa, Nastus, Ochlandra, and Schizostachyum

References

Bambusoideae
Bambusoideae genera